Ferrari made a turbocharged, 2.65-liter, V-8, Indy racing engine, dubbed the Tipo 034, designed and purpose-built for competitive use in the CART PPG Indy Car World Series, but, although tested and unveiled to the press in 1986, never raced.

Technical
For an engine that was supposedly only a bargaining tool, the 637 was well-engineered and carefully thought out. The Type 034 engine was a turbocharged, 32-valve, 90-degree, 2.65-liter V8, as per the CART regulations, which used upward mounted exhausts. It had no intercooler, and ran  of turbo boost pressure.

Applications
Ferrari 637

References

Engines by model
Ferrari engines
IndyCar Series
Champ Car
V8 engines
Ferrari in motorsport
Ferrari